Yadegar-e-Imam Stadium, also popularly known as Sahand Stadium is a multi-purpose stadium in Tabriz, Iran. It is currently used mostly for football matches. The stadium was built in 1996 and has a capacity of 70,000 people. Tractor, the  Iran Premiere league side plays their home games at the stadium.

Sahand Tabriz Stadium is part of the Tabriz Olympic Village.

History

Built
Yadegar-e-Imam Stadium was built in 1989 and was opened on 19 January 1996 when the stadium was officially opened in an inaugural match between Tractor and Machine Sazi. Tractor played their home matches from 1979 until 1996 in the 25,000 capacity Bagh Shomal Stadium (Takhti Stadium), 1976 AFC Asian Cup stadium. Sahand Stadium (Yadegar-e Emam Stadium) was replaced with Bagh-e Shomal Stadium after it was completed in January 1996 and was the second biggest stadium in Iran with 68,833 at this time. The stadium is also part of Tabriz Olympic Complex.

Renovation
In December 2006, 5,000 new seats were installed in the stadium and a large jumbotron scoreboard was added, along with general repairs costing 350 million rials (about 117,000 USD) in total. Its renovation ended in October 2010.

International Matches
Iran National Football Team Matches 

2016 AFC U-16 Championship qualification

References

External links

Tabriz Olympic Village
Tabriz Cycling Track

Football venues in Iran
Multi-purpose stadiums in Iran
Sports venues in Tabriz
Sports venues completed in 1996